Brookefield of the Berrys is a  historic house located at Croom, Prince George's County, Maryland, United States. It is a -story frame house begun about 1810 in the Federal style, and completed in 1840, in the Greek Revival style. The house was finished in 1840 by John Thomas Berry, a prominent plantation family in southern Prince George's County. Berry and his descendants lived at Brookefield from 1840 until 1976. This 19th-century farmstead is well represented by the complex of outbuildings surrounding the house.

Brookefield of the Berrys was listed on the National Register of Historic Places in 1987.

References

External links
, including photo in 1986, at Maryland Historical Trust website

Houses completed in 1840
Houses in Prince George's County, Maryland
Houses on the National Register of Historic Places in Maryland
Greek Revival houses in Maryland
Federal architecture in Maryland
Plantation houses in Maryland
National Register of Historic Places in Prince George's County, Maryland
1840 establishments in Maryland